Albert Victor Lauder (11 October 1898 – 4 September 1971) was an Australian rules footballer who played with Collingwood in the Victorian Football League (VFL).

Lauder was at Collingwood during a prolific period for the club, and despite playing only 36 league games he played in three premiership sides. He always played as a defender, on either a half back flank or back pocket and initially struggled to cement a spot in the side with only five games in his first three seasons. Lauder finished in a losing team on only four occasions during his career.

Lauder holds the League record for the most consecutive games won at the start of a career with 18. His first loss came in the 1929 semi final against Richmond, however Collingwood went on to defeat Richmond in the 1929 VFL Grand Final.

Lauder finished his VFL senior playing career with a record of 32-0-4, representing a winning percentage of 88.89%.

References

External links

Holmesby, Russell and Main, Jim (2007). The Encyclopedia of AFL Footballers. 7th ed. Melbourne: Bas Publishing.

1898 births
1971 deaths
Australian rules footballers from Victoria (Australia)
Collingwood Football Club players
Collingwood Football Club Premiership players
Three-time VFL/AFL Premiership players